Berberis hartwegii is a shrub in the Berberidaceae described as a species in 1840. It is endemic to Mexico, found in the States of Hidalgo, San Luis Potosí, and Tamaulipas.

References

hartwegii
Endemic flora of Mexico
Plants described in 1840
Cloud forest flora of Mexico
Flora of the Sierra Madre Oriental